Baldwin of Ibelin (died 1313) was the ruling Lord of Korakou and of Vitzada, son of John of Ibelin (died after 1250) and Isabelle du Rivet.

Family
He married Marguerite de Giblet and they had :
Isabella of Ibelin († 1315), who married her cousin Guy of Ibelin (1286 † 1308).

1313 deaths
Christians of the Crusades
House of Ibelin
Year of birth unknown